Pepinot and Capucine (French title, Pépinot et Capucine) was a Canadian children's television series which aired on Radio-Canada from 1952 to 1954, and on the English CBC Television from 1954 to 1955.

Premise
This series was produced at Radio-Canada's Montreal studios. The title characters were the puppets Pepinot and his sister Capucine. Other regular characters included Mr. Black, a pet bear, known as l'Ours in French. Mr. White, an inventor, was known on the French series as Monsieur Blanc.

Scheduling
The series was broadcast on Radio-Canada since 7 September 1952 until 1954. After this, the series was simply titled Pépinot which was produced in several runs until 1972. Episodes continued to be rebroadcast through mid-1973.

The half-hour English version appeared on CBC Television on Sundays at 5:30 p.m. in two seasons, first from 3 January to 27 June 1954 and secondly from 19 September 1954 to 19 June 1955.

References

External links
 
 
 "Les personnages de l'émission Pépinot et Capucine" at Bilan du siècle, Université de Sherbrooke 

CBC Television original programming
1954 Canadian television series debuts
1955 Canadian television series endings
1950s Canadian children's television series
Black-and-white Canadian television shows
Canadian television shows featuring puppetry